Escalade Peak is a prominent peak,  high, about  in the Van Allen Range, east of the south end of the Boomerang Range, in Victoria Land. It was so named by the New Zealand party of the Commonwealth Trans-Antarctic Expedition (1957–58) because its vertical pitches and platforms provide a ladder-like route to the summit.

References 

Mountains of Oates Land